Huddersfield Town's 1937–38 campaign was like many recent years dominated by the club's FA Cup run. They reached their 5th and final FA Cup final, before losing to Preston North End at Wembley. They finished their league season in 15th place in Division 1.

Squad at the start of the season

Review
Yet again, Town's season was dominated by their FA Cup run. They reached their fifth and so far last FA Cup Final. After a win over Hull City in Round 3, they scraped past Notts County and Liverpool, they beat York City in the quarter-final in a replay, before beating the favourites Sunderland at Ewood Park in the semi-final, meaning they would play Preston North End in the final, a repeat of the 1922 FA Cup Final, the only one of Town's previous final appearances that they won. The final at Wembley was the first since moving to the London stadium to go into extra time. The result would be the opposite to the 1922 final, with Town conceding a penalty to lose the match 1–0.

Their league form was pretty shaky during the season and they only guaranteed their safety with 2 games to go. Their wins at Leeds Road over Stoke City and Manchester City, the previous season's champions guaranteed their survival in 15th place.

Squad at the end of the season

Results

Division One

FA Cup

Appearances and goals

Huddersfield Town A.F.C. seasons
Huddersfield Town F.C.